Croes-lan is a small village in the  community of Troedyraur, Ceredigion, Wales, which is 65.2 miles (104.9 km) from Cardiff and 185.1 miles (297.8 km) from London. Croes-lan is represented in the Senedd by Elin Jones (Plaid Cymru) and the Member of Parliament is Ben Lake (Plaid Cymru).

References

See also
List of localities in Wales by population

Villages in Ceredigion